Leonida Lari (26 October 1949 – 11 December 2011) was a Moldovan poet, journalist, and politician who advocated for the reunion of Bessarabia with Romania. She published 24 volumes of poetry and prose and was a prolific translator of key works from world literature into Romanian.

Life and career

Leonida Lari was born on 26 October 1949 in Bursuceni, Moldovan SSR, one of the former Soviet Socialist Republics of the Soviet Union. Her parents, Ion and Nadejda Tuchilatu, were teachers. Lari had a younger brother, Leonard Tuchilatu, also a poet, who died when he was only 24 of kidney failure after being exposed to radiation under suspicious circumstances while under mandatory service in the Soviet army.

Leonida Lari graduated from the State University of Chişinău, Moldova, with a major in philology. She worked at the Museum of Literature "D. Cantemir" in Chişinau (1971–1973), was an editor for the journal "Literatură şi Artă" (1985–1988), as well as editor-in-chief (1988–2003) of "Glasul Națiunii", the first publication in the Latin alphabet in the republic of Moldova.

Leonida Lari was one of the leaders of the movement for national emancipation in Bessarabia between 1988 and 1991. She was elected as a representative to the Supreme Soviet of the Soviet Union (1988–1990) and was a member of the Permanent Bureau of the People's Front of Moldova (1990–1992). Between 1990 and 1992, Leonida Lari served as the president of the Christian Democratic League of Women (one of the constituent components of the Social Liberal Party from 2001). In 1992, after repeated threats to the well-being of her children, Leonida Lari and her family fled to Bucharest, Romania. Between 1992 and 2008, Leonida Lari was a representative to the Parliament of Romania.

After a long battle with cancer, Leonida Lari died in Chișinău, Moldova on 11 December 2011. Her death was followed by a state funeral, during which thousands of Moldovans paid their respects.

Works

 Piaţa Diolei (1974)
 Marele vânt (1980)
 Mitul trandafirului (1985)
 Scoica solară (1987)
 Insula de repaos (1988)
 Lumina graitoare (1989)
 Dulcele foc (1989)
 Anul 1989 (1990)
 Lira şi păianjenul (1991)
 Govorâŝij svet (1992)
 Al nouălea val (1993)
 Epifanii (1994)
 Scrisori de pe strada Maica Domnului (1995)
 Lunaria (1995)
 Aldebaran (1996)
 Între îngeri şi demoni (1998)
 Învingătoarele spaţii (1999)
 Insula de repaus (2000)
 Răstignirea porumbeilor (2003)
 Epifanii şi teofanii (2005)
 Infinitul de aur (2006)
 Sibila (2006)
 Traduceri din lirica universala (2009)
 101 poeme (2009)

Awards and distinctions
 Knight of the Order of the Republic of Moldova, 1996
 Honorary Citizen of the City of Bacău (1993)
 The România Mare Award
 The "Flacăra, Totuşi Iubirea" Prize
 The Cronica Award (Iaşi)
 The "Tibiscus" Prize - Serbia
 The "Mihai Eminescu" Prize for Poetry, awarded by the Romanian Academy

References

External links 
 50 de personalităţi ale epocii 87-89
 Activitatea parlamentară a Leonidei Lari în Camera Deputaților din România
Populatia este bludnica
Leonida Lari, keen supporter of Romanian-Moldovan union, dies

Comunicat de presa al Primariei municipiului Chisinau
Am ramas mai saraci fara Leonida Lari
Agentia REGNUM din Rusia o ataca pe Leonida Lari
Stirile ProTV

1949 births
People from Sîngerei District
Moldovan journalists
Moldovan women journalists
Moldovan newspaper editors
Male journalists
Moldovan newspaper founders
Romanian women journalists
Soviet journalists
Soviet newspaper editors
Popular Front of Moldova politicians
Christian Democratic National Peasants' Party politicians
Greater Romania Party politicians
Members of the Chamber of Deputies (Romania)
Recipients of the Order of the Republic (Moldova)
Members of the Congress of People's Deputies of the Soviet Union
Members of the Supreme Soviet of the Soviet Union
Moldovan emigrants to Romania
Romanian translators
Soviet women in politics
Moldovan women in politics
20th-century Romanian women politicians
2011 deaths
Romanian nationalists
20th-century pseudonymous writers
21st-century Romanian women politicians
21st-century Romanian politicians